Malynove is a village in Shchastia Raion (district) in Luhansk Oblast of eastern Ukraine, at about 8.0 km NW from the centre of Stanytsia Luhanska.

The War in Donbas, that started in mid-April 2014, has brought along both civilian and military casualties.

Demographics
In 2001 the settlement had 73 inhabitants. Native language as of the Ukrainian Census of 2001:
Ukrainian — 21.92%
Russian — 78.08%

References

Villages in Shchastia Raion